Peltopleuridae were an extinct family of prehistoric bony fish. It is classified with the order Peltopleuriformes.

Classification
 Family †Peltopleuridae Bough 1939
 Genus †Marcopoloichthys Tintori et al. 2008
 †Marcopoloichthys ani Tintori et al. 2008
 Genus †Peripeltopleurus Bürgin 1992
 †P. besanensis Bürgin 1992
 †P. hypsisomus Bürgin 1992
 †P. vexillipinnis Bürgin 1992
 Genus †Placopleurus Brough
 †P. primus Brough 1939
 †P. besanensis (Bassani 1886) [Pholidophorus besanensis Bassani 1886]
 Genus †Peltopleurus Kner 1866a [Tripelta Wade 1940]
 †P. brachycephalus Liu & Yin 2006
 †P. dirumptus Griffith 1977
 †P. dubius Woodward 1890 [Tripelta dubia (Woodward 1890)]
 †P. humilis Kner 1914
 †P. kneri Woodward 1895
 †P. lissocephalus Brough 1939
 †P. nitidus Xu & Ma 2016
 †P. nothocephalus Bürgin 1992
 †P. nuptialis Lombardo 1999 [Peltopleurus humilis Kner 1914 in partim]
 †P. orientalis Su 1959
 †P. rugosus Brough 1939
 †P. splendens Kner 1866a

Bibliography

References

Peltopleuriformes
Prehistoric ray-finned fish families